Hjalte Bo Nørregaard (born 8 April 1981) is a Danish professional football manager and former player. He was most recently the caretaker manager of Danish Superliga club FC Copenhagen. As a player, he played as a midfielder and spent most of his career with FC Copenhagen.

Nørregaard is son of former Danish footballer Klaus Nørregaard. In November 2018, he was appointed manager for the under-19 team of FC Copenhagen. In October 2020, he was appointed caretaker manager of the club.

Biography
Nørregaard started his career in Kjøbenhavns Boldklub (KB) and was in 1999 promoted to the first team, F.C. Copenhagen (FCK). He played for FCK until 2005 most famous for his 91st-minute goal against the archrivals Brøndby IF at Brøndby Stadium in the so-called "championship final" in 2003. Since then, fans of F.C. Copenhagen have dubbed Brøndby Stadium, "Hjalte Park." The same year he was awarded as "cup fighter" after the win in the Danish Cup. He got a total of 120 matches, 17 goals and three Danish championships in 2001, 2003 and 2004, before moving to Dutch club SC Heerenveen.

The stay at Heerenveen was no success, as coach Gertjan Verbeek thought he was a supporting striker. After only one year in Heerenveen, he moved back to FCK for competing in their 2006–07 UEFA Champions League campaign.

Nørregaard was called up for the January 2007 league national team, which played three unofficial national team games in the United States, El Salvador and Honduras in January 2007, by national team manager Morten Olsen. He played in all three games of the tour, including a 3–1 loss to the United States national team and a 1–0 loss to El Salvador.

In September 2008, after some strong league performances he was called up for the Denmark national team, for the second time, for the matches against Hungary and Portugal to help Denmark in their 2010 FIFA World Cup qualification campaign. However, in the match against Hungary, he wasn't even picked for substitution.

On 4 January 2011, Nørregaard signed a deal with the Danish football club AGF. The contract is for three and a half years.

In August 2014, Nørregaard moved to Vendsyssel FF on a free transfer.

On 10 October 2020, Nørregaard was appointed interim manager of FC Copenhagen after the Ståle Solbakken was sacked.

Honours
FC Copenhagen
 Danish Superliga: 2002–03, 2003–04, 2006–07, 2008–09, 2009–10; runner-up: 2004–05
 Danish Cup: 2003–04, 2008–09; runner up: 2006–07
 Royal League: 2004–05; runner-up: 2006–07

Individual
FC København player of the year: 2005, 2009
FC København Hall of fame: 2006
 Danish Cup Fighter: 2004

References

External links
 
 Official Danish Superliga stats
 

1981 births
Living people
Danish men's footballers
Footballers from Copenhagen
Association football midfielders
Denmark international footballers
Denmark youth international footballers
Denmark under-21 international footballers
F.C. Copenhagen players
SC Heerenveen players
Aarhus Gymnastikforening players
Vendsyssel FF players
Danish Superliga players
Eredivisie players
Danish expatriate men's footballers
Expatriate footballers in the Netherlands
Danish expatriate sportspeople in the Netherlands
Danish football managers
Danish Superliga managers
F.C. Copenhagen managers